TCG Salihreis (F 246) is a  of the Turkish Navy.

Development and design 

Barbaros-class frigates were designed in Germany and are part of the MEKO group of modular warships, in this case the MEKO 200 design. Two ships were built in Germany and two in Turkey with German assistance. They are larger than the previous s and are also faster due to using CODOG machinery rather than pure diesels.

The first two vessels (F 244 and F 245) are defined as the Barbaros class (MEKO 200 TN Track II-A) while the last two vessels (F 246 and F 247) are defined as the Salih Reis class (MEKO 200 TN Track II-B) by the Turkish Navy.

Salih Reis subclass ships are built with 8-cell Mk. 41 VLS and longer than Barbaros class vessels to accommodate 16-cell Mk. 41 VLS upgrade in the future while Barbaros-class vessels built with  Mk.29 Sea Sparrow launchers that planned to be replaced by 8-cell Mk. 41 VLS.

Construction and career 
Salihreis was launched on 26 September 1997 by Blohm+Voss in Hamburg and commissioned on 22 July 1998.

On 29 April 2020, Salihreis was sent to assist the Royal Canadian Navy in search for a missing helicopter from HMCS Fredericton.

References

External links

 The First Upgraded MEKO 200 Frigate Of Turkish Navy
 BARBAROS CLASS ( MEKO 200 Track II) (Turkey)

1997 ships
Ships built in Germany
Frigates of the Turkish Navy
Barbaros-class frigates of the Turkish Navy